Aligarh Airport is an upcoming domestic airport situated at Aligarh - Sikandra Rao Road in outskirts of Aligarh city in the Indian state of Uttar Pradesh. It is being developed by upgrading the existing government airstrip.

Proposed destination
As of now, Lucknow and Kanpur are the destinations which is proposed for direct flight from this airport under the Regional Connectivity Scheme UDAN.

References

Airports in Uttar Pradesh
Proposed airports in Uttar Pradesh
Buildings and structures in Aligarh
Airports with year of establishment missing